Ivan Kurtušić (born 28 April 1984) is a retired Serbian footballer who is the manager of Serbian First League club Mačva Šabac.

Playing career
Born in Belgrade, SR Serbia, he started to play football with Red Star Belgrade. In 2001 Kurtušić moved to FK Vojvodina. In 2002 Kurtušić made his first professional contract with FK Sartid Smederevo when he was only 17 years old.

Next season, he played for FK Vlasina and FK Obilić in the Serbian First League. In summer 2008, he moved to FK Pobeda of the Macedonian First Football League. After his spell in Macedonia, Kurtušić returned to Serbia and during the following seasons he represented a number of clubs, namely OFK Kikinda, FK Obilić, FK Sinđelić Niš and Mladenovac.

During the winter break of the 2011–12 season, he moved abroad again, this time signing with Maltese Premier League team Marsaxlokk. In the 2012–13 season he signed with Gudja United. He scored 4 goals in 9 games for the team and that was the perfect recommendation for the famous Maltese club Żejtun Corinthians to take him and sign him to the end of the 2012–13 season. He helped the club to stay in the league that season playing 5 games for them.

His next career move was signing a contract with Bahraini Premier League team Manama Club on a one-year deal. In 2014, he got an offer and signed a contract until the end of the season for Sheikh Russel KC in the Bangladesh Premier League, last year's champion team. With his new team he was part of the history of football in Bangladesh as a member of the squad in the AFC President's Cup, where the Bangladesh team reached the final round of this competition for the first time ever. In summer 2016, he signed for Hong Kong First Division club Eastern District.

Coaching career
In 2020, Kurtušić was appointed a first-team coach of Hong Kong Premier League defending champions Tai Po. The club started a six-game unbeaten streak, breaking into the semi-finals of the Hong Kong FA Cup.

References

External links
 
 

1984 births
Living people
Footballers from Belgrade
Serbian footballers
Association football midfielders
FK Smederevo players
FK Vlasina players
FK Obilić players
FK Pobeda players
OFK Kikinda players
FK Sinđelić Niš players
OFK Mladenovac players
Marsaxlokk F.C. players
Gudja United F.C. players
Sheikh Russel KC players
FK Sloga Kraljevo players
Serbian First League players
Hong Kong First Division League players
Serbian expatriate footballers
Expatriate footballers in North Macedonia
Expatriate footballers in Malta
Expatriate footballers in Bahrain
Expatriate footballers in Bangladesh
Expatriate footballers in Hong Kong